Agyneta sandia is a species of sheet weaver found in the United States. It was described by Duperre in 2013.

References

sandia
Spiders described in 2013
Spiders of the United States